The siege of Hataya was one of several battles in Japan's Tōhoku region which served as preludes to the decisive Sekigahara Campaign which would end the 250-year period of war known as Sengoku.

Naoe Kanetsugu, Uesugi Kagekatsu's general loyal to Ishida Mitsunari, attacked Hataya castle on his way to pursue Mogami Yoshiaki at Yamagata Domain, His force was 20,000 strong, against the 300 man of Mogami garrison under Eguchi Gohei. The garrison have come to be celebrated in various chronicles for their brief, but brave, defense against such incredible odds.

References
 Turnbull, Stephen (1998). 'The Samurai Sourcebook'. London: Cassell & Co.

Hataya
Hataya
1600 in Japan
Conflicts in 1600